The Grammy Award for Best Traditional Folk Album was awarded from 1987 to 2011.  Until 1993 the award was known as the Grammy Award for Best Traditional Folk Recording.

An award for Best Contemporary Folk Album was also presented.  Prior to 1987 contemporary and traditional folk were combined as the Best Ethnic or Traditional Folk Recording.

The award was discontinued in a major overhaul of Grammy categories. In 2012 this category was merged with Best Contemporary Folk Album to form the new Best Folk Album category.

Years reflect the year in which the Grammy Awards were presented, for works released in the previous year.

Recipients

References 

Album awards
Grammy Awards for folk music